Alluri Sitarama Raju (4 July 1897 or 1898 – 7 May 1924) was an Indian revolutionary who waged an armed campaign against the British colonial rule in India. Born in present-day Andhra Pradesh, he was involved in opposing the British in response to the 1882 Madras Forest Act, which actively restricted the free movement of Adivasis in their forest habitats, and prevented them from practicing their traditional form of agriculture called podu. Rising discontent towards the British led to the Rampa Rebellion of 1922 in which Alluri Sitarama Raju played the major role as its leader. Mustering combined forces of Adivasis, farmers and other sympathizers, he engaged in guerilla campaigns against the British in the border regions of then Madras Presidency (now parts of East Godavari and Visakhapatnam). He was given the title: "Manyam Veerudu" by the local people for his heroic exploits.

Born into a Telugu speaking family, Alluri who took up sannyasa at 18, became a charismatic leader of the downtrodden tribal people in 20th century colonial India. Harnessing widespread discontent against British colonial rule in the backdrop of the 1920 Non-cooperation movement, Alluri led his forces in the Rampa Rebellion of 1922 against the colonial rulers with an aim to expel them from the Eastern Ghats region. During this rebellion he led numerous raids on the imperial police stations to acquire firearms for his under-equipped forces. After each raid, he would leave behind a letter written by him informing the police about the details of his plunder there, including details of the weaponry he parted away with and dare them to stop him if they can.

Police stations in and around areas of Annavaram, Addateegala, Chintapalle, Dammanapalli, Krishna Devi Peta, Rampachodavaram, Rajavommangi, and Narsipatnam were all targeted by his forces, resulting in significant police casualties. In response to these raids, and to quell the rebellion, the British colonial authorities undertook a nearly two-year long manhunt for Alluri, resulting in expenditures reaching over ₹4 million rupees then. Eventually in 1924, he was trapped by the British at the village of Koyyuru in Chintapalle forests. There, he was captured, tied to a tree and summarily executed by a firing squad. His final resting place lies at Krishnadevipeta in Andhra Pradesh.

Biography

Birth and childhood

Alluri Sitarama Raju was born in a Telugu speaking family in the current state of Andhra Pradesh, India. His father, Venkata Rama Raju, was a professional photographer who settled in the town of Rajamundry for his vocation; and his mother, Surya Narayanamma, was a pious homemaker.

His date of birth is disputed, with some sources reporting it as 4 July 1897, and others as 4 July 1898. Details of his place of birth vary, an official report suggests he was born in Bhimavaram, while several other sources cite it to be the village of Mogallu in West Godavari District. New reports suggest that the village of Pandrangi in Bheemunipatnam is his precise place of birth.

Venkata Rama Raju, was a free spirited man with immense self respect and great love for freedom. He once chided a young Rama Raju for practicing the then prevalent custom of Indian people saluting the Europeans in acknowledgement of their superiority. He died when his son was eight.

Early life and education
Rama Raju completed his primary education and joined High school in Kakinada, where he became a friend of Madduri Annapurnaiah (1899–1954), who later grew up to be another prominent Indian revolutionary. In his teens, Rama Raju in accordance with his reticent and meditative nature, contemplated taking Sannyasa. At age 15, he moved to his mother's home town of Visakhapatnam and enrolled at Mrs. A.V.N. College for the fourth form exam. While there, he often visited far flung areas in the Visakhapatnam district, and became familiar with the struggles of the tribal people there.

Around this time, he became a friend of a rich man and developed platonic love for his friend's sister named Sita, whose untimely demise left him heartbroken. To make her memory eternal, Rama Raju then prefixed her name to his, and came to be popularly known as Sita Rama Raju. He eventually dropped out of college without completing his course. At this instance his uncle Rama Krishnam Raju, a tehsildar in Narsapur of the West Godavari district, under whose tutelage he grew up so far, brought him to Narasapur and admitted him to the local Taylor High School. He however later gave up his schooling, but privately mastered the literature of Telugu, Sanskrit, Hindi and English languages. Contemporary reports indicate that although he had an undistinguished education, he took a particular interest in astrology, herbalism, palmistry and equestrianism, before becoming a sannyasi at the age of 18.

Growth as leader
Indicative of his future as a leader, Alluri in his high school days was often found riding his uncle's horses to distant hilly places and familiarise himself with the various problems being faced by the different tribal people, who were then living under British colonial rule. He was particularly moved by seeing the hardships of the Koyas, a people of hill tribe. Fond of pilgrimage, in 1921 he visited Gangotri and Nashik, birthplaces of the holy rivers—Ganga and Godavari. During his travels in the country, he met various revolutionaries in Chittagong; on seeing the socio-economic conditions of people, particularly those of the tribals, he was severely appalled and decided to build a movement for their independence from British rule. He then settled down in the Papi hills near Godavari District, an area with a high density of tribal people.

Sitarama Raju initially practiced various spiritual disciplines to gain moral stature and spiritual powers. During this time, the efforts of Christian missionaries to gain converts by any means amongst the hill tribes annoyed him, as he saw it as a tool perpetuating imperialism. He continued living an austere life with bare minimum needs amongst the tribal people. Taking only items like fruits and honey from them, he would return much of everything offered to him with his blessings. Very soon his charismatic nature gained him a reputation among the tribals of being someone possessed with holy powers, even a messianic status—a reputation that was bolstered both by myths he created about himself, and by his acceptance of ones about him that were established by others, including those concerning his reputed invincibility.

Noting the grievances of the tribals and finding solutions to their problems, he started to organise and educate them about their rights, and prepared them for a fight against the oppression and tyranny of the forest and revenue officials, missionaries and police. Touring the forest terrains, he gained extensive knowledge of the geographical features which helped him in his future as a guerrilla warfare tactician. Around this time when the British authorities confiscated their ancestral properties, the Koya tribal brothers, Gam Malludora and Gam Gantamdora, who were freedom fighters, joined the ranks of Rama Raju and became his lieutenants. As the oppressive practices of the British continued to become unbearable and rebellion became the last option for people to live free, Rama Raju became their natural leader. The Government then did try to win him over by offering 60 acres of fertile land for his ashram, but he rejected it and stood by the people.

Rampa Freedom struggle (1922–1924)

Origins
After the passing of the 1882 Madras Forest Act, in an attempt to exploit the economic value of wooded areas, its restrictions on the free movement of tribal people in the forests prevented them from engaging in their traditional podu agricultural system, a form of subsistence economy which involved the system of shifting cultivation. The changes meant that they will face starvation, and their main means of avoiding it was to engage in the demeaning, arduous, foreign and exploitative coolie system being used by the government and its contractors for such things as road construction.

Around the same time of the Act, the Raj authorities had also emasculated the traditional hereditary role of the muttadars, who had until then been the de facto rulers in the hills as tax collectors for the plains-living rajas. Those people were now reduced to the role of mere civil servants, with no overarching powers, no ability to levy taxes at will, and no right to inherit their position. Thus, the cultivators and the tax collectors, who once would have been in opposition to each other, were instead now broadly aligned in their disaffection with colonial power.

Rama Raju harnessed this discontent of the tribal people to support his anti-colonial zeal, whilst accommodating the grievances of those muttadars sympathetic to his cause, rather than those who were selfish in their pursuit of a revived status for themselves. This meant that most of his followers were from the tribal communities, but also included some significant people from the muttadar class, who at one time had exploited them, although many muttadars remained ambivalent about fighting for what he perceived to be the greater good.

To attract people's support, Alluri adopted aspects from the Non-cooperation movement such as promoting temperance, and the boycott of colonial courts in favour of local justice administered by panchayat courts. Although the movement died out in early 1922, it had by then reached the plains area as he was involved in propagation of some of its methods among the hill people so as to raise their political consciousness and desire for change. These actions caused him to be put under the surveillance of police from around February of that year; despite this move, the fact that Alluri was using his propaganda as a camouflage to foment armed uprising seems to have not been noticed by either the movement, or the political leadership of the British.

Actions
With his supporters, Alluri built a strong and powerful troops of fighters. Sporting traditional weaponry like bow-and-arrow and spears, and employing tactics like using whistles and beating drums to exchange messages amongst themselves, the revolutionaries managed to achieve spectacular successes initially in their struggle against the British. Realising that traditional weaponry would not be of much use against the British, who were all well equipped with modern firearms, he thought the best way forward is to take them away from the enemy and started launching attacks on their police stations.

Between 22 and 24 August 1922, Alluri led a troop of 500 people in the raid and plunder of police stations at Chintapalli, Krishnadevipeta and Rajavomangi. He gained possession of various weaponry from the seize—including 26 muskets, 2,500 rounds of ammunition, six .303 Lee Enfield Rifles and one revolver. He subsequently toured the area, getting more recruits and killing a police officer who was part of a force sent to find him. A hallmark of these raids was that after each attack, he would sign a letter in the stations diary, giving details of the plunder there, complete with the date and time of his attack, and dare the police to stop him if they can.

The British struggled in their pursuit of Alluri; partly because of the unfamiliar terrain, and also because the local people in the sparsely populated areas were unwilling to help them, but instead were outrightly keen to assist Alluri, including with providing shelter and intelligence. While based in the hills, contemporary official reports suggested that the core group of rebels dwindled to between 80 and 100, but this figure rose dramatically whenever they moved to take action against the British because of the involvement of people from the villages.

More deaths occurred on 23 September when Alluri ambushed a police party from a high position as they went through the Dammanapalli Ghat, killing two officers, and thus cementing his reputation among the disaffected people. There were two additional successful attacks against the police during September. At this pointafter the British realised that Rama Raju's style of guerilla warfare would have to be matched with a similar response, and drafted in members from the Malabar Special Police who were trained for such purposes. Attempts to persuade local people to inform about or withdraw their support for Rama Raju, through both incentives and reprisals did not succeed. Later raids were carried out on the police stations at Annavaram, Addateegala, Narsipatnam and Rampachodavaram.

During these raids, Rama Raju was ably supported by his trusted assistant named Aggi Raju, whose exploits were considered heroic. As the rebellion continued unabated, detachments of the Assam Rifles regiment were eventually brought in to quell it. The fight continued for about two years capturing the attention of common people, as well as powerful officials across the country. To end the rebellion and capture Alluri Sitarama Raju, the then district collectors, Bracken of East Godavari, and R.T. Rutherford of Visakhapatnam, having jurisdiction powers over the areas of rebellion employed all means possible, both fair and foul, from burning villages to destroying crops, killing cattle and violating women, all to no avail.
The agency commissioner, J. R. Higgins announced a monetary reward of Rs 10,000 for the head of Rama Raju, and Rs 1,000 each for his lieutenants Ghantam Dora and Mallam Dora. In April 1924, to quell the ‘Manyam’ uprising, the British Government then deputed T. G. Rutherford, who resorted to employing extreme methods of violence and torture on people to know the whereabouts of Raju and his close followers.

As Alluri was mostly garnering support from the plains areas, the British cordoned off the hills and limited his influence between the regions of Peddavalasa, Gudem and Darakonda. In spite of this, Alluri tried to court people to his side, particularly the Congressmen from the plains, but was unsuccessful as they were against Alluri on the ground that he was violating the Gandhian principle of Nonviolence.

Death and legacy

After putting up a massive effort for nearly two years, the British eventually managed to capture Alluri in the forests of Chintapalle, he was then tied to a tree and summarily executed by shooting on 7 May 1924 in the village of Koyyuru. The tomb of Alluri currently lies in the village of Krishnadevipeta, near Visakhapatnam. His lieutenant, Ghantam Dora, was killed on 6 June 1924, and his brother Mallam Dora was caught and imprisoned, who after Indian independence, became an elected member of the Lok Sabha in 1952 from Visakhapatnam constituency.

The efforts of Alluri in waging an armed conflict, without any state powers against one of the most powerful empires has been recognised by all. The British government grudgingly acknowledged him as a powerful tactician of the Guerrilla warfare that lasted for nearly two years, the fact that over ₹4 million was spent in those days to defeat him speaks for itself. 
 
Mahatma Gandhi paid his tribute to Alluri's life, saying, "Though I do not approve of his armed rebellion, I pay my homage to his bravery and sacrifice." Jawaharlal Nehru commented that, "Raju was one of those few heroes that could be counted on fingers." Netaji Subhas Chandra Bose noted that Alluri was fierce in his determination, and his unparalleled courage and sacrifice for people will ensure him a place in history.

Historian David Arnold in his book The Rebellious Hillmen: The Gudem-Rampa rising 1839–1924, noted that because of his name, the tribals used to evoke the image of the Hindu deity "Rama" in Alluri, an honorary which despite being a religious man he never asked for.

The Independent Indian government released a postal stamp in his honour at the village of Mogallu, considered by many to be his birthplace. The Government of Andhra Pradesh, besides building memorials at places associated with his life, granted a political pension to his surviving brother. In 2022, the Government of Andhra Pradesh carved out a new district named after Alluri from the erstwhile Visakhapatnam district, with Paderu as its headquarters.

In popular culture
 The 1974 Telugu-language movie Alluri Seetarama Raju, featuring actor Krishna, depicts his life.
 In 1986, the Indian Postal Department issued a commemorative stamp featuring him in the series 'India's struggle for freedom'.
 The Government of Andhra Pradesh celebrates his birthday, 4 July, annually as a state festival.
 Alluri Sitarama Raju Cricket Stadium in Eluru is named after him.
 On 9 October 2017, at the request of members of parliament Thota Narasimham and V. Vijayasai Reddy, the Government of India decided to install a statue of him at the precincts of the Parliament of India in recognition of his work as a freedom fighter, and for the welfare of the tribal people.
RRR (2022), an Indian Telugu language film directed by S. S. Rajamouli, features a fictional story based on the lives of Alluri and Komaram Bheem, with Ram Charan portraying the role of Alluri. The plot of the film, set in 1920, revolves around both rebels who fought the British in colonial India.

References

Bibliography

Further reading

External links
 

1890s births
1924 deaths
Indian revolutionaries
Deaths by firearm in India
Telugu people
Indian independence activists from Andhra Pradesh
Alluri Sitarama Raju
20th-century executions by British India
Adivasi people